The Institute of Indonesia Chartered Accountants, formerly Indonesian Institute of Accountants or Ikatan Akuntan Indonesia (IAI) is the national organisation of professional accountants in Indonesia. IAI is a founding member of the International Federation of Accountants (IFAC) and the ASEAN Federation of Accountants (AFA).

In 2016 IAI became an Associate Member of Chartered Accountants Worldwide.

References

Professional associations based in Indonesia
Organizations established in 1957
Member bodies of the International Federation of Accountants